Liege Airport , previously called Liege-Bierset Airport, is an international airport located  west of the city of Liège, Wallonia in Belgium. The airport mainly focuses on air freight. At the end of 2021, freight traffic reached 1,412,498 tonnes (+26%). Liege Airport is now the 5th biggest cargo airport in Europe and the 22nd biggest in the world.

Overview
The airport is located in Grâce-Hollogne, Liège Province, north-west of the city of Liege, in the east of Belgium. The first terminal on the site opened in 1930.

It is mainly used for freight/cargo operations, but also serves a number of destinations for passengers (mainly charters). Liege is located in the centre of the golden triangle Paris – Amsterdam – Frankfurt that handles 66% of European freight, and 75% when taken together with London. In 2018, it was the seventh biggest cargo airport in Europe. Liege Airport is the biggest cargo airport in Belgium, and the third-biggest for passengers after Brussels Airport and Brussels South Charleroi Airport. It is the global hub of ASL Airlines Belgium (the former TNT Airways) and is also used by several other cargo carriers on a scheduled or irregular basis.

Airlines and destinations

Passenger
As of July 2020, TUI fly Belgium is the only airline offering scheduled and seasonal passenger flights at Liege Airport.

Cargo

Statistics

Accidents and incidents
On February 20, 2021, a Boeing 747-400 freighter airplane, flying Longtail Aviation flight 5504, which was bound for John F. Kennedy International Airport in New York, New York from the nearby Maastricht Aachen Airport in the Netherlands, had to divert  to the airport after take-off after one engine caught fire and debris fell over the town of Meerssen. Two people on the ground were injured.

Ground transportation

By car
The airport is located next to the E42 (exit 3), close to an important highway junction.

By bus
An express bus (number 57) links the airport to Liege-Guillemins where connections can be made with local, national and high speed international trains (Thalys, ICE). Bus number 53 goes to Liege city centre (Place Saint-Lambert) where connections are available with Liege-Saint-Lambert railway station and bus hub, and to Pont-de-Seraing railway station and bus hub. Buses 83 and 85 connect the airport with Liege's city centre (Place Saint-Lambert) where connections are available with Liege-Saint-Lambert railway station and bus hub, and Bierset-Awans railway station.

See also 
 Transportation in Belgium

References

Notes

External links 
 
  

Airports in Liège Province
World War II airfields in Belgium
Airports established in 1914
Grâce-Hollogne